Nina Rosic (born May 5, 1990) in Belgrade is a female volleyball player from Serbia. She is playing for OK Crvena zvezda.

Career
Nina won the Best Libero award at the 2007–08 CEV Cup Final Four and her team won the bronze medal.

Clubs
  Crvena zvezda Belgrade (2007-2010)
  Voléro Zürich (2010-2014)
  Crvena zvezda Belgrade (2014)

Awards

Individuals
 2007–08 CEV Cup Final Four "Best Libero"

National team
 2009 European League -  Gold Medal

Clubs
 2007–08 CEV Cup -  Bronze medal, with Crvena Zvezda Belgrade
 2008–09 CEV Cup -  Silver medal, with Crvena Zvezda Belgrade
 2010/11 Swiss Cup -  Champion, with Voléro Zürich
 2010 Swiss Supercup -  Champion, with Voléro Zürich

References

External links
 Nina Rosic
 Nina Rosic Crvena zvezda

1990 births
Living people
Serbian women's volleyball players
Sportspeople from Belgrade
Serbian expatriate sportspeople in Switzerland
21st-century Serbian women